Iron Station is an unincorporated community and census-designated place (CDP) in Lincoln County, North Carolina, United States. A primarily industrial town, Iron Station's population was 755 as of the 2010 census. It also serves as a bedroom community for the larger cities of Charlotte, Hickory, and Lincolnton.

The Iron Station post office has a ZIP code of 28080.

History
Ingleside, Magnolia Grove, and Tucker's Grove Camp Meeting Ground are listed on the National Register of Historic Places.

Iron Station was named for its history as an iron mining town with a train station.

Geography
The community is southeast of the center of Lincoln County, along North Carolina Highway 27, which leads northwest  to Lincolnton, the county seat, and southeast  to Charlotte.

The community is in the Piedmont region of North Carolina, and the town center is on a ridge which drains northeast to Dellinger Branch, which forms the northeastern border of the CDP, and southwest to Hoyle Creek. The entire community is part of the Catawba River watershed.

Demographics

Education
Iron Station Elementary School
East Lincoln Middle School
East Lincoln High School in Denver

References

Unincorporated communities in North Carolina
Unincorporated communities in Lincoln County, North Carolina
Census-designated places in Lincoln County, North Carolina
Census-designated places in North Carolina